Mohammed Al-Haiti (born February 10, 1996) is a Saudi Arabian professional footballer who plays for Al-Ettifaq as a goalkeeper.

Career
Al-Haiti began his career at the youth team of Al-Ettifaq. On 31 January 2018, Al-Haiti joined First Division side Al-Hazem on loan for the 2017–18 season. On 18 April 2019, Al-Haiti made his debut for Al-Ettifaq in the league match against Al-Ittihad. On 8 September 2019, Al-Haiti renewed his contract with Al-Ettifaq for another five years.

References

External links 
 

1996 births
Living people
People from Dammam
Association football goalkeepers
Saudi Arabian footballers
Ettifaq FC players
Al-Hazem F.C. players
Saudi Professional League players
Saudi First Division League players